This is a list of stellar streams. A stellar stream is an association of stars orbiting a galaxy that was once a globular cluster or dwarf galaxy that has now been torn apart and stretched out along its orbit by tidal forces. An exception in the list about Milky Way streams given below is the Magellanic Stream, composed of gas (mostly hydrogen).

Local Group streams

Milky Way streams

Andromeda Galaxy streams

Streams beyond the Local Group

See also

 Lists of astronomical objects
 List of nearby stellar associations and moving groups
 Field of Streams
 Stellar kinematics
 Galaxy merger
 Local Bubble
 Satellite galaxies of the Milky Way

References

Further reading

External links
 
 
 
 
 

Milky Way
Star clusters
Dwarf galaxies